Bolívar Efrén Gómez Valencia (born July 31, 1977 in Esmeraldas) is an Ecuadorian football defender. He obtained one international cap for the Ecuador national football team, making his only appearance in 1999.

References

1977 births
Living people
Sportspeople from Esmeraldas, Ecuador
Association football defenders
Ecuadorian footballers
Ecuador international footballers
1999 Copa América players
C.D. El Nacional footballers
C.S.D. Macará footballers
Manta F.C. footballers